Engelbert I of Nassau (in Dillenburg3 May 1442, in Breda) was a son of Count John I of Nassau-Siegen and Countess Margaret of the Mark, daughter of Count Adolph II of the Marck.

Early years
Engelbert of Nassau was a student in Cologne, Germany in 1389 and a dean in Münster from 1399-1404. He became counselor to the Duke of Brabant, first to Anton of Burgundy, and later for his son Jan IV of Brabant. He would later serve Philip the Good.

Marriage and issue
Engelbert's brothers were childless and he left the deanery so he could marry Johanna van Polanen in 1403. They had six children:
 John IV, Count of Nassau-Siegen (born 1 August 1410) married Mary of Looz-Heinsberg
 Henry II, Count of Nassau-Siegen (born 7 January 1414) married 1) Genoveva of Virneburg 2) Irmgard of Schleiden-Junkerath
 Margaretha (born 1415), married Diederik, Count of Sayn
 Willem (born December 1416)
 Mary (born 2 February 1418 - died 2 October 1472), married Count John II of Nassau-Wiesbaden-Idstein
 Philip (born 13 October 1420 – died 1429)

Engelbert had an illegitimate daughter with an unknown mistress:
 Margaretha of Nassau. She married Hugo Wijnrix.

He died May 3, 1442 in Breda. A mausoleum was built for Engelbert in the Church-of-Our-Lady (the Great Church) in Breda. The construction took thirty years, from 1460 to 1490.

References

1370 births
1442 deaths
Year of birth uncertain
House of Nassau

Counts of Nassau
Marshals of Westphalia
People from Dillenburg
Military personnel from Hesse